Walthall M. Moore, Sr. (May 1, 1886 – April 8, 1960) was an American politician from Alabama who represented St. Louis  in the Missouri House of Representatives.  He was the first African American to serve in the Missouri state legislature.  Moore was a member of the 51st, 53rd, 54th, and 55th General Assemblies.  On December 29, 1911, he married Miss F. A. Ferguson in Marion, Indiana.

In 1919, a group of African American men organized the Citizen's Liberty League to help elect African Americans to political office and encourage the appointment of African Americans to public offices. It was an organization associated with the Republican Party seeking support from the party. It helped elect Moore. He was returned to the Missouri House of Representatives in the 1924 general election as one of four legislators elected from St. Louis City's 3rd district.

Moore represented a constituency where three-quarters of voters were white.  He is also known for helping to upgrade and change the name of Lincoln Institute to Lincoln University, a school founded in 1866 by veterans of the United States Colored Troops.  Moore was a delegate to the 1928 Republican National Convention from Missouri.  Until Missouri's capital Jefferson City passed a public accommodations law in the late 1960s, African-American legislators were forced to stay either in private homes or in a dormitory at Lincoln University.

References

1886 births
1960 deaths
African-American state legislators in Missouri
Republican Party members of the Missouri House of Representatives
People from Marion, Alabama
Howard University alumni
20th-century American politicians
20th-century African-American politicians
African-American men in politics